Everton Mlalazi is Zimbabwean gospel artist.

Background
Everton Mlalazi was born in 1982 in Harare, Zimbabwe. He had his early childhood in Nyamandhlovu, Bulawayo and later went back with his parents to Harare in Glennorah suburb where he had his primary education.
 
Mlalazi started professional music career in 2014 when he put together a musical ensemble called The Vine Music Ministry as the founder and director. Mlalazi rose to prominence when he then started his solo career in the year 2020 in which he released his debut album, In The Presence 1 in November 2021 following the success of the singles Uyingcwele and Ekhaya. Ever since then, he had significant radio success having several songs in charts. Uyingcwele was on number one for five weeks on Star FM Gospel Greats and number three on overall top 50 gospel songs of the year 2020. Uyingcwele and Ekhaya made it into the Skys Metro FM annual top 50 with Uyingcwele in the top 10 at number eight. Ekhaya made it onto the Classic 263 Annual Top 50.

His other songs that include Bambelela, My Father’s House , Mwari Hamushanduki , Pfugama Unamate and No Night There did very well on gospel charts at main radio stations (Star FM Zimbabwe, Skys Metro FM, ZiFM Stereo, Radio Zimbabwe and Power FM Zimbabwe) in 2021. My Father’s House was number three on the ZiFM Annual Top 50. No Night There and Mwari Hamushanduki also made it into the Top 50. Pfugama Unamate was on Radio Zimbabwe top 50 chart for 2021 as well as number one  on Star FM Annual Top 50 and No Night There was number one on the Power FM  Annual Top 50.

Everton Mlalazi is married to Gamuchirai Mlalazi and has two daughters.

Discography

Albums
In The Presence 1 (2021)

Singles
Jesus is the answer
Uyingcwele
Ekhaya
My Fathers House feat. Xolly Mncwango
Pfugama Unamate feat. Michael Mahendere
No Night There
Jesus Paid it all
Mwari Hamushanduki feat. Benjamin Dube

Awards and recognition
Best Live Production (The Vine) - PERMICAN Awards 2019
Best Gospel Song of the year nomination (Uyingcwele) - Star FM Music Awards 2020
Best Newcomer - Star FM Music Awards 2021
Best Gospel song of the year nomination (Uyingwele) - Star FM Music Awards 2021
Best Gospel song of the year nomination (Pfugama Unamate) - Star FM Listeners Choice Awards 2022
Best Producer nomination - Zimbabwe Music Awards
Best Contemporary Gospel Artist - Zimbabwe Music Awards 2022

References

21st-century Zimbabwean male singers
1982 births
Living people
Zimbabwean composers
Zimbabwean songwriters